The William Hodges Fellowship residency programme is the successor to the Southland Art Foundation Artist in Residence.

The origins of the William Hodges Fellowship date back to 1980 with the establishment of the Southland Savings Bank Art Foundation. The Southland Art Foundation Artist In Residence was established in 1996 by a joint partnership between Southland Art Foundation, Creative New Zealand, Southland Museum & Art Gallery and the Southern Institute of Technology.

In 1999 the Southland Art Foundation Trustees–Shirley Palmer, Gwen Neave, Russell Beck and Wayne P, Marriott resolved to rename the Artist in Residence programme the William Hodges Fellowship. This was in recognition of the acquisition of William Hodges “Maori before a Waterfall”, 1773 by the Southland Museum & Art Gallery in 1998. Hodges was regarded as the first non-Maori artist in residence in Southland, having depicted the flora, fauna and people of the region during Cook’s second voyage to New Zealand.

The inaugural William Hodges Fellowship was awarded to Jo Ogier, printmaker, from Dunedin in 2000.

On Friday 3 November 2000 Burwell House was opened as the residence for the William Hodges Fellow.

The partnership of Southland Museum and Art Gallery, Southland Art Foundation, Southern Institute of Technology, and Creative New Zealand has continued to develop the fellowship, providing the opportunity for artists to work financially unencumbered for a period of time, as well as working closely with the local community.

Artists/Fellows in Residence
 1996 Ans Westra, Photographer
 1996 Irene Ferguson, Printmaker
 1996 Ruth Myers, Sculptor
 1996 Geoff Dixon, Painter
 1996 Tracy Collins, Painter
 1997 Kalvin Collins, Abstract Painter
 1997 Mark Adams, Photographer
 1997 Geoff Dixon, Painter
 1998 David Sarich, Painter
 1998 John Z Robinson, Painter
 1998 Janet de Wagt, Painter
 1998 Joanna Margaret Paul, Painter
 1998 Murray Grimsdale, Painter/Illustrator
 1999 Murray Grimsdale, Painter/Illustrator
 1999 Jo Ogier, Printmaker
 1999 Cilla McQueen, Poet/Painter
 2000 Jo Ogier, Printmaker
 2000 Margaret Dawson, Photographer
 2000 Nicholas Twist, Photographer
 2001 Ross T Smith, Photographer
 2001 Margaret Dawson, Photographer
 2002 Irene Ferguson, Painter/Printmaker
 2002 Laurence Berry, Painter
 2002 Lorraine Webb, Painter
 2003 Maryrose Crook, Painter/Musician
 2004 Keely McGlynn, Glass Sculptor
 2004 Jane Zusters, Painter
 2004 Lucy Dolan, Painter
 2005 Mark Braunias, Painter
 2006 Regan Gentry, Sculptor
 2006 Miranda Parkes, Painter
 2007 James Walker, Glass Sculptor
 2007 Peter Peryer, Photographer
 2008 Anna Muirhead, Mixed Media/Installation
 2008 Ana Terry & Don Hunter, Mixed Media Artists
 2009 Nic Moon
 2010 Deborah Barton
 2011 Robyn Belton, Illustrator 
 2011 Max Bellamy, Artist
 2011 Jo Torr, Artist
 2012 Heather Straka
 2012 Gary Freemantle
 2013 James Robinson, painter
 2014 Sam Mitchell, painter
 2015 Stephen Mulqueen, sculptor
2018 Anita de Soto, painter
2022 Daegan Wells, sculptor
2022 Kyla Cresswell, printmaker

Exhibitions

References

External links
 Margaret Dawson: http://www.artists.co.nz/margaretdawson.htm
 Ross T. Smith: http://www.rosstsmith.co.nz/curriculum.html
 Laurence Berry: http://www.whangareiartmuseum.co.nz/exhibitions/past/2005/takitimu_longitude.html
 Lorraine Webb: http://www.quayschool.ac.nz/cv/lorraine_webb.html
 Miranda Parkes: http://www.vavasourgodkin.co.nz/artists/bio.php?artist=Miranda+Parkes
 James Walker: http://www.walkerjames.com/index.html
 Peter Peryer: http://www.artsfoundation.org.nz/peryer.html
 Anna Terry: http://www.otagopolytechnic.ac.nz/fileadmin/DepartmentalResources/Academic/Art/Programmes/MFA/MFA_Candidates/Ana_Terry/anaterrycv.pdf

Fellowships
Visual arts awards
Arts in New Zealand